Benjamin Tweneboah (born 7 September 1994) is a Ghanaian professional footballer who plays as a forward for Ghanaian Premier League side Aduana Stars. He previously played for Elmina Sharks.

Early life 
Born in 1994 in Kumasi, the capital city of the Ashanti Region of Ghana, Tweneboah had his basic school education in Kumasi, where he began playing football. He was raised by his mother Martha Asare, a petty trader in the Central Business District of Kumasi after the demise of his father at an early age. Tweneboah played for colts team Top Rankers and Young Chelsea, a Division Two League side both in Kumasi.

Career

Elmina Sharks 
Tweneboah joined Elmina Sharks in the 2015–16 season. He immediately became a key member of the side and eventually helped them to gain promotion to the Ghana Premier League for the first time in the club's history. His notable performance in the run to the top flight league was on 26 April 2016, when he scored a hat-trick in their 5–0 victory over Tarkwa United. From 2017 to 2021, he formed an attacking partnership along with Benjamin Bernard Boateng. He signed a two-year contract extension with the club in December 2019. In his debut season in the Ghana Premier League, he scored 7 goals and made 5 assists in 23 matches. After spending six years playing for the club, he parted ways after refusing to sign a contract extension due to non-payment of his salary for 3 months.

Aduana Stars 
In February 2021, Tweneboah joined Aduana Stars on a free transfer after his contract with Elmina Sharks ended. He ended the season with 9 goals. He played his first competitive match for the club on 6 March 2021, after coming on in the 63rd minute in a 2–1 loss to Karela United via a brace from Diawisie Taylor. On 11 April 2021, he scored his debut goal for Aduana, in the process he scored a brace to push the Ogya Boys to a 3–1 victory over King Fiasal Babes. He was subsequently nominated for the GPL NASCO player of the month for April. However, the award was won by Abdul Basit.

References

External links 
 
 

1994 births
Ghanaian footballers
Association football forwards
Association football wingers
Elmina Sharks F.C. players
Aduana Stars F.C. players
Ghana Premier League players
Living people